Adama Sulemana is a Ghanaian politician and member of parliament for the Tain constituency in the Bono region of Ghana.

Early life and education 
Adama was born on 6 March 1978 and hails from Nsawkaw in the Bono region of Ghana. He had his BECE in 1989 and also in 1992. He also had his SSSCE in 1995. He further had his Bachelor of Education in Psychology in 2006 and his Master in Philosophy in Psychology in 2009.

Career 
Adama was the DCE of Tain under the Ministry of Local Government and also a Health Teacher under the Ministry of Health.

Political career 
Adama is a member of NDC and currently the MP for Tain Constituency. He won the parliamentary seat with 20,374 votes making 45.4% of the total votes cast whilst the NPP parliamentary aspirant Gabriel Osei had 18,346 votes making 40.9%.

Committees 
Adama is a member of the Standing Orders Committee and also a member of the Communications Committee.

Personal life 
Adama is a Christian.

References 

Ghanaian MPs 2021–2025
Living people
1978 births
National Democratic Congress (Ghana) politicians